The Saucelle Dam is a gravity dam on the Douro River. The dam straddles the border of Spain and Portugal but is owned and operated by Spain's Iberdrola. Construction on the dam began in 1950 and was completed in 1956. The primary purpose of the dam is hydroelectric power production and it has an installed capacity of 520 MW. The power is produced by two power stations, both located just downstream. Saucelle I was commissioned in 1956 and contains four 62.5 MW Francis turbine-generators for an installed capacity of 251 MW. Saucelle II is located underground and was commissioned in 1985. It contains two 134.5 MW Francis turbine-generators for an installed capacity of 269 MW.

See also

Aldeadávila Dam – upstream

References

Dams in Spain
Dams on the Douro River
Dams completed in 1956
Hydroelectric power stations in Spain
Energy infrastructure completed in 1956
Energy infrastructure completed in 1985
Gravity dams
Underground power stations
Buildings and structures in the Province of Salamanca
Energy in Castile and León